The 2011 UCI World Tour was the third edition of the ranking system launched by the Union Cycliste Internationale (UCI) in 2009.  The series started with the Tour Down Under's opening stage on 18 January, and consisted of 14 stage races and 13 one-day races, culminating in the Giro di Lombardia on 15 October.


Events
All 26 events from the 2010 UCI World Ranking were included, though the UCI ProTour classification of events under which 16 of these were previously promoted has now been disbanded.  In addition to this, the five stage Tour of Beijing has been added to the schedule.

The 18 teams that hold UCI ProTeam status are obliged to participate in all races. The organisers of each race can additionally invite other teams that hold UCI Pro-Continental status, or an ad hoc national selection, to compete.

†: Riders promoted after removal of the results of Alberto Contador.
^: Riders promoted after removal of the results of Juan José Cobo.

Final standings
In a change from previous years, only riders of a UCI ProTeam were to be able to score points for the world ranking. However, in early 2012, the UCI included such riders in a revised table, but non ProTour teams were still omitted from the team rankings.  This was subsequently reverted, and the 52 non ProTeam riders were again removed from the calculations.

Alberto Contador, who initially finished in third place overall, had his results retrospectively removed in February 2012, and his points were reallocated.  Spain had been leader of the nation rankings before this reallocation.

Individual
Source:

Riders tied with the same number of points are classified by number of victories, then number of second places, third places, and so on, in World Tour events and stages.

 230 riders on UCI ProTour teams scored points.

Team
Source:

Team rankings were calculated by adding the ranking points of the top five riders of a team in the table.

Nation
Source:

National rankings were calculated by adding the ranking points of the top five riders registered in a nation in the table. The national rankings are used to determine how many riders a country can have in the World Championships and the Olympics.

 Riders from 35 countries scored points.

Leader progress

References

 
Uci World Tour, 2011
UCI World Tour